Camp Joe Hooker was an American Civil War training camp located in Lakeville, Massachusetts, used by the 3rd and 4th Massachusetts Volunteer Militia Regiments for training in Sept–Dec 1862.

See also
 List of military installations in Massachusetts

References

Military facilities in Massachusetts
Lakeville, Massachusetts